The Pac-12 Conference pitcher of the Year is a baseball award given to the Pac-12 Conference's most outstanding pitcher. From 1991 to 1998, an award was given to the most outstanding pitcher in the South division. After the 1999 season, the divisions were eliminated, making all Pac-12 pitchers eligible.

Key
Also known to be the first indian born professional baseball player, drafted by the Philadelphia Phillies in 1994 and the Texas Rangers in 1995

Winners

1999–present

South Division (1991–1998)

Winners by school

Footnotes
 For purposes of this table, the "year joined" reflects the year that each team joined the conference now known as the Pac-12 as currently chartered. Although the Pac-12 claims the Pacific Coast Conference (PCC), founded in 1915, as part of its own history, that conference disbanded in 1959 due to infighting and scandal. That same year, five PCC members established the Athletic Association of Western Universities (AAWU) under a new charter that functions to this day. The pitcher of the Year Award was not established until 1978, by which time all of the final members of the PCC except for Idaho were reunited in what was then the Pac-8.
 Oregon discontinued its baseball program after the 1981 season, re-instating it before the 2009 season.

References

 
Awards established in 1991
pitcher
NCAA Division I baseball conference players of the year
1991 establishments in the United States